EIFF may refer to:

Edinburgh International Film Festival
Edmonton International Film Festival